Aslan-Bey Sharvashidze was a prince of the Principality of Abkhazia in 1808–10. He was the second son of Kelesh Ahmed-Bey Sharvashidze. Aslan-Bey was associated with pro-Turkish elements of the region, and was responsible for rebelling against and later killing his father in order to ascend the throne of the Principality. According to George Hewitt this a Russian fabrication and the assassination was organised by Aslan-bey's brother Sefer-Bey, Nino Dadiani and the Russian military administration.

Aslan-bey turned the town of Sukhumi into his royal residence, which at the time, was guarded by a Turkish military regiment.  Aslan-Bey actively fought together with King Solomon II of Imereti against Tsarist Russian forces.

In 1810, after several decisive Russian military victories, Sharvashidze was driven out of Sukhumi together with the Turkish regiment that was protecting him and fled to Turkey. After Aslan-Bey’s expulsion from Abkhazia, the Tsarist Russian leadership established Aslan-Bey’s brother, Sefer Ali-Bey, as the new ruler of Abkhazia.

In an interview with Nikoloz/Nicolas Sharvashidze (Head descendant of Aslan-bey) it was mentioned that the elder descendants of the Aslan-Bey branch of the Sharvashidze family currently preside in Georgia, while the junior branch is stated to have gone extinct in Turkey.

References

 Georgian State (Soviet) Encyclopedia. 1983. Book 10. p. 688.
 Sinop Etnografya Museum/Aslan Torun Mansion

Princes of Abkhazia
Aslan-Bey